Richard James Langridge (13 April 1939 – 3 January 2005) was an English first-class cricketer who played for Sussex from 1957 to 1971. He was the son of the English Test cricketer James Langridge, who also played for Sussex.

Langridge was a tall left-handed opening batsman who had particular success in the early 1960s, making 1675 runs in 1961 followed by 1885 runs in 1962. He made the highest of his five first-class centuries against Leicestershire in 1963, when he carried his bat for 137 not out in a Sussex total of 222.

References

External links

1939 births
2005 deaths
English cricketers
Sussex cricketers
Sportspeople from Brighton
Combined Services cricketers
Marylebone Cricket Club cricketers